Wilkinson Creek is a  long 2nd order tributary to the Haw River in Chatham County, North Carolina.

Course
Wilkinson Creek rises about 1 mile east of Terrells Mountain in Chatham County and then flows south to the Haw River upstream of Bynum.

Watershed
Wilkinson Creek drains  of area, receives about 47.4 in/year of precipitation, and has a wetness index of 392.39 and is about 77% forested.

See also
List of rivers of North Carolina

References

Additional maps

External links
Article on Emerald Ash Borer found at Wilkinson Creek

Rivers of North Carolina
Rivers of Chatham County, North Carolina